A lookout, lookout rafter or roof outlooker is a wooden joist that extends in cantilever out from the exterior wall (or wall plate) of a building, supporting the roof sheathing and providing a nailing surface for the fascia boards.  When not exposed it serves to fasten the finish materials of the eaves.

Notes

Roofs
Building engineering
Structural system